Erika Fatland (born 1983) is a Norwegian anthropologist and writer who has written multiple critically-acclaimed books, including Sovietistan and The Border.

Early life and career 
Fatland was born in Haugesund, Norway, in 1983, and studied at the University of Oslo and the University of Copenhagen.

Fatland is best known for her travel writing and has written several books: Her first travel book Sovietistan, published in 2015, was an account of her travels through five post-Soviet Central Asian nations, Kazakhstan, Tajikistan, Kyrgyzstan, Turkmenistan and Uzbekistan. It has been translated into 12 languages. The book was reviewed by Financial Times and Kirkus Reviews.

This was followed by The Border: A Journey Around Russia Through North Korea, China, Mongolia, Kazakhstan, Azerbaijan, Georgia, Ukraine, Belarus, Lithuania, Poland, Latvia, Estonia, Finland, Norway, and the Northeast Passage, an account of her travels around Russia's border, from North Korea to Norway. Both books have been translated into English by Kari Dickson, and both received critical acclaim from reviewers in the US and UK. The book was reviewed by The Washington Post.

She wrote two earlier books: The Village of Angels (2011) about the Beslan massacre and The Year Without a Summer about the Utoya massacre. She has also written the children's book The Parent War.

She has received numerous awards, among them the Norwegian Booksellers’ Prize for Nonfiction and the Wesselprisen (2016). She speaks eight languages including Norwegian, English, French, Russian, German, Italian, and Spanish. She lives in Oslo.

Bibliography 
 The Village of Angels (2011)
 Sovietistan: Travels in Turkmenistan, Kazakhstan, Tajikistan, Kyrgyzstan, and Uzbekistan (2020)
 The Border: A Journey Around Russia Through North Korea, China, Mongolia, Kazakhstan, Azerbaijan, Georgia, Ukraine, Belarus, Lithuania, Poland, Latvia, Estonia, Finland, Norway, and the Northeast Passage (2021)

References 

Living people
1983 births
Norwegian writers
Writers about Russia
Norwegian women writers
University of Copenhagen alumni
University of Oslo alumni